"Yep!" is a song written by Duane Eddy and Lee Hazlewood and performed by Eddy. The song reached #17 on the UK Singles Chart and #30 on the Billboard Hot 100 in 1959. The song appeared on his 1959 album, Especially for You.

The song was produced by Lee Hazlewood and Lester Sill.

Other versions
The Surfaris released a version as part of an EP in October 1963.

References

1959 songs
1959 singles
Songs written by Duane Eddy
Songs written by Lee Hazlewood
Duane Eddy songs
Song recordings produced by Lee Hazlewood
Song recordings produced by Lester Sill